Kokotungo is a rural locality in the Shire of Banana, Queensland, Australia. In the  Kokotungo had a population of 100 people.

Geography 
The Dawson Valley (Theodore) railway line passes through the locality from the east (Goovigen) and travels slightly south-west across the locality passing through the three railway stations:

 Kokotungo railway station
 Kooemba railway station
 Kalewa railway station

before exiting to the south-west (Baralaba). The railway line has now closed and the stations are abandoned.

History 
Kokotungo is an Aboriginal name for a local hill.

Kokotungo State School opened on 6 November 1939 and closed on 27 January 1969.

In the  Kokotungo had a population of 100 people.

Notable residents 
Notable people born in or near Kokotungo include:

 Alwyn Torenbeek (1937-2015),  drover, horse whisperer, endurance rider, bronc rider and author

References 

Shire of Banana
Localities in Queensland